Bungandidj is a language of Australia, spoken by the Bungandidj people, Indigenous Australians who lived in an area which is now in south-eastern South Australia and in south-western Victoria. According to Christina Smith and her book on the Buandig people, the Bungandidj called their language drualat-ngolonung (speech of man), or Booandik-ngolo (speech of the Booandik). As of 2017, there is a revival and maintenance programme under way for the language.

Historical variants of the name include: Bunganditj, Bungandaetch, Bunga(n)daetcha, Bungandity, Bungandit, Buganditch, Bungaditj, Pungantitj, Pungatitj, Booganitch, Buanditj, Buandik, Booandik, Boandiks, Bangandidj, Bungandidjk, Pungandik, Bak-on-date, Barconedeet, Booandik-ngolo, Borandikngolo, Bunganditjngolo, and Burhwundeirtch.

Phonology 
Bungandidj phonology is typical of Australian languages generally, sharing characteristics such as a single series of stops (no voicing contrast) at six places of articulation, a full corresponding set of nasals, laminals at all four coronal places of articulation and two glides. Extrapolating from historical written sources and knowledge of surrounding languages, Blake posits the following consonant inventory:

Consonants

Vowels

Notes on orthography 
 Early descriptions of Bungandidj made no distinction between the trill/flap /r/ and approximant /ɻ/ and evidence for this contrast is based on comparative evidence only.
 Although there is no voicing distinction, stops are transcribed with voiced symbols  in homorganic nasal-stop clusters (where voicing is expected).
 Syllable-final palatals are transcribed with the digraphs  to avoid a final -y being confused with a vowel.

A poem
Smith (1880), on pages 138–139, records a poem written in Bungandidj : (Fly beetle, bat, night)
 (Fly, march-fly, beetle)
 (parrot, little parrot.)
 (wattle bird,)
 (minah bird.)

References 

Drual languages
Extinct languages of South Australia
Extinct languages of Victoria (Australia)